Siberian Ukrainians form a national minority in Siberia and the Russian Far East, but make up the majority in some cities there. Siberian Ukrainians, one of the largest and historically important constituent parts of the Ukrainian diaspora, represent one of the first Ukrainian diasporas.

History

Russian Empire

Two million Ukrainian peasants settled in Siberia between the 1600s and 1917. In the 19th century, the government of Russia encouraged peasants to move from the western parts of the empire to Siberia. Ukrainian peasants, not as burdened by the traditional Russian communal system of agriculture as the Russian peasants had been, seemed ideal candidates for resettlement, often more willing to go in return for the promise of more land. The literacy societies were among the few public service organizations in Tsarist Russia. The Khar’khov Society, while Russian-speaking, included many Ukrainians and was among the most active of such societies.

Cossack Settlement

Soviet era

Dekulakization

Kulaks and their families were deported.

World War II refugees
During Operation Barbarossa evacuations commenced of Russian, Belarusian and Ukrainian civilians from Europe over the Ural Mountains. These evacuees included skilled Russian and Jewish workers and professionals as well as nationally conscious members of the Ukrainian clergy and intelligentsia. The Soviets feared that the Nazis would exploit the ethno-national detachment of the educated and many were prohibited from returning to Ukraine after the war.

Gulag
During the Stalin era, and especially after World War II many Ukrainians were sent to Gulag; some of them were former participants of the Ukrainian Insurgent Army. Ukrainians contributed to the Norilsk Uprising and other gulag uprisings in 1953. Many (but not all) Ukrainians living in Siberia and Russia are the descendants of prisoners.

Modern Russia
After the collapse of the Soviet Union many Ukrainians chose to stay in Siberia, unlike many other nationalities. That combined with natural growth caused their share of the population to increase. However overall the population numbers declined due to assimilation.

Post Maidan Events

Ukrainian exodus
In mid-2014, trains began to arrive in Siberia carrying Ukrainian refugees. Many refugees and immigrants were welcomed by Siberian natives and many settled in predominantly indigenous areas.

Many however, were unaware of their location upon their arrival, in one case, immigrants from Ukraine arriving in Magadan walked out of the plane confused - asking reporters where they were. Analysts assume Ukrainians are arriving in depopulated areas (i.e. Igarka) for the purpose of repopulation.

Areas of settlement
Green Ukraine
Grey Ukraine
Norilsk

Population
Large numbers of people with full or partial Ukrainian descent were born in Siberia and live there. Large numbers of immigrants also live in Siberia, while another large group includes illegal immigrants.

Notable Siberian Ukrainians
Gennady Alferenko
Anatoly Babko
Konstantin Chernenko
Valeria Ivanenko
Tina Karol
Vitali Kischenko
Ilya Lagutenko
Petro Oliynik
Oleksandr Opanasenko
Anastasia Prokopenko
Oleg Sukhoruchenko
Vladimir Tatarchuk
Vitaly Teslenko
Nikolai Usenko
Aleksey Yakimenko
Dmitri Yaroshenko
Kostyantyn Zhevago
Alexander Shlemenko

Ukrainian Culture in Siberia
There are several Ukrainian Language Newspapers in Siberia, as well as privately funded Ukrainian language schools.
The Ukrainian Catholic Church has Branches in many Siberian towns and villages that serve the immigrants from Western Ukraine

See also
Ukrainians in Kuban
Ukrainians in Russia
Ukrainian diaspora

References